The 2021 ABA League First Division Playoffs will be the play-off tournament that decides the winner of the 2020–21 ABA League First Division season.

Qualified teams

Bracket

Semifinals

|}

Game 1

Crvena zvezda v Igokea

Budućnost v Mornar

Game 2

Igokea v Crvena zvezda

Mornar v Budućnost

Game 3

Crvena zvezda v Igokea

Finals

|}

Game 1

Game 2

Game 3

Game 4

Game 5

See also 
 2021 ABA League Second Division Playoffs

References

External links 
 Official website
 ABA League at Eurobasket.com

2020–21 in Montenegrin basketball
2020–21 in Serbian basketball
2020–21 in Bosnia and Herzegovina basketball